The 2022 World Taekwondo Grand Prix is the 8th edition of the World Taekwondo Grand Prix series.

Schedule

Men

58 kg

68 kg

80 kg

+80 kg

Women

49 kg

57 kg

67 kg

+67 kg

Medal table

References

External links
World Taekwondo

World Taekwondo Grand Prix
Grand Prix